Otto I, Count of Salm ( – 1150) was a German nobleman.   He was a ruling count of Salm and from 1125 to 1137, he was co-ruler of the  County Palatine of the Rhine with his stepson William.

Life 
His parents were the German anti-king Hermann of Salm and his wife Sophia of Formbach.  Around 1115, he married Gertrude, the widow of Count Palatine Siegfried of Ballenstedt, daughter and heir of Henry, Margrave of Frisia and Gertrude of Brunswick. Gertrude was also the sister of Richenza of Northeim, the consort of Emperor Lothair III.

After his stepson Count Palatine William of the Rhine had died in 1140, he claimed the County Palatine of the Rhine. However, King Conrad III of Germany, who had been elected in 1138, decided that the County Palatine was a completed fief, and hence fell back to the King, who gave it to his brother-in-law and devoted supporter Herman of Stahleck.

Otto managed to keep Treis Castle until 1148, and Rheineck Castle until 1151.  In 1148, war broke out between Otto and the Emperor.  The Emperor took Treis Castle in 1148, and gave it to the Elector of Trier.  In 1151, he captured and destroyed Rheineck Castle.

Family 
Otto married Gertrude, daughter of Henry, Margrave of Frisia. They had several children, including:
 Otto II ( – 1148/1149), fought against Herman of Stahleck to recapture the County Palatine of the Rhine and was taken prisoner in 1148.  He was later strangled at Schönburg Castle, near Oberwesel in 1148 or 1149
 Sophia, married Dirk VI, Count of Holland (d. 6 August 1157)
 Beatrix, married Wilbrand I, Margrave of Frisia

References 
Johann Christian von Stramberg: Rheinischer Antiquarius, part III, vol. 5, p. 490 ff
M. Schaab, Geschichte der Kurpfalz (Kohlhammer Verlag 1988).

Notes

Counts Palatine of the Rhine
Year of birth uncertain
Salm family
1080s births
1150 deaths
12th-century German nobility